Phospholipid scramblase 1 (PL scramblase 1) is an enzyme that in humans is encoded by the PLSCR1 gene.

Interactions 

PLSCR1 has been shown to interact with:

 CPSF6, 
 Epidermal growth factor receptor,
 NEU4, 
 SHC1, 
 SLPI,  and
 TFG.

See also 
Scramblase

References

Further reading